is a Japanese TV personality, model and actress who is a former member of the Japanese idol girl group Nogizaka46.

Career
In 2011, Matsumura auditioned for Nogizaka46 and was chosen as one of the first generation members. Her audition song was Yui's "Feel My Soul". She was chosen as one of the members performing on their debut single "Guruguru Curtain" and took the middle position for that song. The single was released on February 22, 2012. In April 2013, she regularly appeared on the television drama Bad Boys J with other Nogizaka46 members. On March 23, 2015, she was chosen as an exclusive model for the women's fashion magazine CanCam along with former Nogizaka46 bandmate Nanami Hashimoto, who was also a first generation member.

In January 2021, she and fellow Nogizaka46 member Erika Ikuta performed a cover of the song "1・2・3" by Mafumafu and Soraru; the song was used as an opening theme to the anime series Pokémon Master Journeys: The Series. On April 15, 2021 Matsumura announced her graduation on her Niconico program . Her graduation concert was held at the Yokohama Arena on June 22 and 23, 2021. She officially graduated from the group on July 13, with her posting on its official blog for the last time that day. Her blog posts were deleted on August 19.

She also graduated from CanCam in that magazine's October issue, which was released on August 20.

On September 30, 2021, it was announced that Matsumura will become a regular model for the fashion magazine Baila in that magazine's November issue, released on October 12.

Discography

Singles with Nogizaka46

Albums with Nogizaka46

Other featured songs

Filmography

Television

Films

Theater

Bibliography

Magazines
 CanCam, Shogakukan 1981-, as an exclusive model from the May 2015 issue to the October 2021 issue
Baila, Shueisha 2001-, as a regular model since November 2021 issue

Photobooks
 Kikan Nogizaka vol.4 Saitō (December 26, 2014, Tokyo News Service) 
 Igai tte iuka, Mae kara kawaii to omotteta (December 12, 2017, Shogakukan)

References

External links 
 
 

Nogizaka46 members
1992 births
Living people
Women bass guitarists
Japanese idols
Japanese voice actresses
Japanese women pop singers
Japanese guitarists
Japanese bass guitarists
Japanese female models
People from Osaka Prefecture
Musicians from Osaka Prefecture
21st-century Japanese singers
21st-century Japanese women singers